Robert "Bob" Roselle (born October 17, 1950) is a Canadian former professional ice hockey player who played in the World Hockey Association (WHA). Roselle played one game with the Indianapolis Racers during the 1975–76 WHA season. He was drafted in the fifth round of the 1970 NHL Amateur Draft by the Boston Bruins.

References

External links

1950 births
Boston Bruins draft picks
Canadian ice hockey centres
Ice hockey people from Montreal
Indianapolis Racers players
Kansas City Blues players
Living people
London Knights players
Seattle Totems (WHL) players
Sorel Éperviers players
Tulsa Oilers (1964–1984) players
Wiener EV players
Canadian expatriate ice hockey players in Austria
Canadian expatriate ice hockey players in the United States